Giuseppe Piccio was a Venetian literary critic and editor of the Italian literary magazine L’Alba. An instructor at the Marco Foscarini Royal Gymnasium, Piccio also compiled the Dizionario veneziano–italiano, published in 1916, significantly at a time when Venetian had been gradually losing favor to Tuscan even among Venetian literary circles. The Dizionario remains one of the few extant dictionaries of Venetian to this day.

Bibliography
 Impressioni sull'Iacopo Ortis (Voghera, 1886)
 L’Alba (Venice, 1896–1901)
 Dizionario veneziano-italiano: Con note grammaticali e fonologiche seguite da testi dialettali (Venice, 1916)

References

19th-century Italian writers
19th-century male writers
20th-century Italian writers
20th-century male writers
Giuseppe
Writers from Venice
Italian literary critics
Italian schoolteachers
Italian magazine editors
Italian lexicographers
Year of birth missing
Year of death missing